Košarkaški klub Žarkovo, commonly referred to as KK Žarkovo, is a men's professional basketball club based in Belgrade, Serbia. They are currently competing in the First Regional League of Serbia (3rd-tier).

The club was founded in 1975 and was named after Žarkovo, an urban neighborhood of Belgrade.

Players

Coaches 

  Đorđe Ilić (2018–2021)

Trophies and awards

Trophies
 First Regional League (Central Division) (3rd-tier)
 Winners (1): 2016–17

References

External links
 Official website 
 Profile at srbijasport.net 
 Profile at eurobasket.com

Zarkovo
Basketball teams established in 1975
1975 establishments in Serbia